The 2015 Mountain West Conference football season was the 17th season of college football for the Mountain West Conference (MW). In the 2015 NCAA Division I FBS football season, the MW had 12 football members: Air Force, Boise State, Colorado State, Fresno State, Hawaii, Nevada, New Mexico, San Diego State, San Jose State, UNLV, Utah State, and Wyoming.

Pre-season

Mountain West Media
2015 Mountain West Media Day will be held at The Cosmopolitan in Las Vegas, NV on July 28, 2015.

Preseason polls

 Predicted Mountain West Championship Game Winner: Boise State is picked to win the Mountain West title game over San Diego State.

Preseason All-Mountain West Teams

Preseason Offensive Player of the Year:
Rashard Higgins, Jr., WR, Colorado State
Preseason Defensive Player of the Year:
Kyler Fackrell, Sr., LB, Utah State
Preseason Special Teams Player of the Year:
Donny Hageman, Sr., PK, San Diego State

(* - member of the 2014 All-Mountain West first team)

(** - member of the 2014 All-Mountain West second team)

Recruiting classes

Award watch lists
The following Mountain West players were named to preseason award watch lists.

Maxwell Award:
 Rashard Higgins–Colorado State
 Chuckie Keeton–Utah State
 Donnel Pumphrey–San Diego State

Chuck Bednarik Award:
 Kamalei Correa–Boise State
 Kyler Fackrell–Utah State
 Darian Thompson–Boise State

John Mackey Award:
 Kivon Cartwright–Colorado State
 Billy Freeman–San Jose State
 Jarred Gipson–Nevada
 Jake Phillips–UNLV
 Steven Walker–Colorado State

Fred Biletnikoff Award:
 Devonte Boyd–UNLV
 Rashard Higgins–Colorado State
 Jalen Robinette–Air Force
 Hunter Sharp–Utah State
 Thomas Sperbeck–Boise State

Bronko Nagurski Trophy:
 Kamalei Correa–Boise State
 Kyler Fackrell–Utah State
 Ian Seau–Nevada
 Darian Thompson–Boise State

Outland Trophy:
 Austin Corbett–Nevada
 Marcus Henry–Boise State

Jim Thorpe Award:
 Donte Deayon–Boise State
 Damontae Kazee–San Diego State
 Trent Matthews–Colorado State
 Weston Steelhammer–Air Force
 Darian Thompson–Boise State
 JJ Whitaker–San Diego State

Lombardi Award:
 Kamalei Correa–Boise State
 Marcus Henry–Boise State
 Rees Odhiambo–Boise State
 Tanner Vallejo–Boise State
 Ben Clarke–Hawai'i
 Ian Seau–Nevada
 Alex Barrett–San Diego State
 Darrell Greene–San Diego State
 Pearce Slater–San Diego State
 Christian Tago–San Diego State
 Nick Vigil–Utah State
 Kyler Fackrell–Utah State
 Eddie Yarbrough–Wyoming

Rimington Trophy:
 Bo Bonnheim–Fresno State
 Austin Stephens–Utah State
 Marcus Henry–Boise State

Davey O'Brien Award:
 Chuckie Keeton–Utah State

Doak Walker Award:
 Tyler Ervin–San Jose State
 Brian Hill–Wyoming
 Marteze Waller–Fresno State
 Shaun Wick–Wyoming
 LaJuan Hunt–Utah State
 Don Jackson–Nevada
 Donnel Pumphrey–San Diego State

Walter Camp Award:
 Rashard Higgins–Colorado State
 Darian Thompson–Boise State

Lott Trophy:
 Calvin Munson–San Diego State
 Weston Steelhammer–Air Force

Lou Groza Award:
 Donny Hageman–San Diego State

Coaches
NOTE: Stats shown are before the beginning of the season

*first year as conference member, ^achieved as head coach of New Mexico from 99 to 08

Rankings

Schedule

Championship game

The championship game was played on December 5, 2015. It featured the Air Force Falcons, champions of the Mountain Division, and the San Diego State Aztecs, champions of the West Division. The game was played at Qualcomm Stadium in front of 20,959. San Diego State won the game 27–24 to claim their first outright conference championship since 1986, and their first ever outright Mountain West Conference championship.

Bowl games

Mountain West vs Power Conference matchups

Records against other conferences
2015 records against non-conference foes:

Regular Season

Post Season

Awards and honors

All Conference teams

Offensive Player of the Year: Donnel Pumphrey, JR., RB, San Diego State
Defensive Player of the Year: Damontae Kazee, JR., DB, San Diego State
Special Teams Player of the Year: Rashaad Penny, SO., RS, San Diego State
Freshman of the Year: Brett Rypien, QB, Boise State
Coach of the Year: Rocky Long, San Diego State

Offense:

Defense:

(* - Two-Time First-Team Selection)(** - Two-Time Second-Team Selection)(*** - Three-Time Second-Team Selection)

All-Academic

Home game attendance

Bold – Exceed capacity
†Season High

References